A social network is a theoretical concept in the social sciences, particularly sociology and anthropology, referring to a social structure made up of individuals or organizations.

Social network may also refer to:

Academic
 Social Networks (journal), an academic journal
 Social network (sociolinguistics), social network as defined in the field of sociolinguistics
 Social network analysis, the academic study of social networks

Business
 Business networking, an activity in which groups of like-minded businesspeople recognize, create, or act upon business opportunities
 Enterprise social networking, focuses on the use of online social networks or social relations among people who share business interests and/or activities
 Professional network service, a type of social network service that is focused solely on interactions and relationships of a business nature

Internet
 Distributed social network, an Internet social networking service that is decentralized and distributed across different providers
 List of social networking websites, major active social networking websites (excluding dating websites)
 Social media, a new medium for social interaction, based on social networking service
 Social media marketing, the use of social media platforms and websites to promote a product or service
 Social network aggregation, the process of collecting content from multiple social networking services
 Social network automation, tools that are used to semi/automate the process of posting content to social networking and social bookmarking websites
 Social networking service, services which act as online sites to connect people with similar interests
 Social-network game, online games where many people can play at once

Other uses
 The Social Network, a 2010 biographical drama film
 The Social Network (soundtrack), a soundtrack album from the film